Baghdad Gaja Donga is a 1968 Telugu-language swashbuckler film directed by D. Yoganand. It stars N. T. Rama Rao and Jayalalithaa, with music composed by T. V. Raju. It is produced by P. Padmanabha Rao under the Padma Gowri Pictures banner.

Plot 
The film begins with the birthday celebrations of Baghdad prince Faruk when Chief Commander Vazeer Hussain (Rajanala) forcibly collects taxes from the public. Sultan (Mikkilineni) of Baghdad realises it and one night he travels in disguise to identify the truth. At that moment, Vazeer kills him, confines his Begam Saheba (Pandari Bai) in prison and also tries to eliminate the Prince, but he is saved by Ibrahim (Mukkamala), a blind loyal royal agent. After that, Vazeer becomes Sultan of Baghdad. Ibrahim shifts to Basra, Faruk grows as Abu (N. T. Rama Rao) and becomes a kind-hearted burglar who helps the poor along with his friend Ali (Padmanabham). One day he enters Basra Sultan's (Relangi) palace, where he gets the acquaintance of princess Naseem (Jayalalitha) and both of them fall in love. Meanwhile, Vazeer arrives at Basra, decides to marry Naseem by luring the Sultan to which Naseem refuses and escapes. At the same time, Abu enters into the palace to meet Naseem when Vazeer captures him. Even after escaping Naseem comes into Vazeer's fold and he takes her to Baghdad. On the other side, Abu breaks out the jail with the help of Ali, learns regarding Naseem and reaches Baghdad. After reaching Baghdad palace he recognises himself as the prince. Now Abu makes a plan along with Nazeem to find his mother. There onwards, Abu makes huge robberies in the kingdom and attains the name  The Thief of Baghdad. Meanwhile, Ali insults a street magician, so, he converts him into a monkey and says that he will get his original form if he dips into the water. Abu recognises that the monkey is his friend Ali and keeps him in the palace at Sadiq (Madhukuuri Satyam) Vazeer's son. Parallelly, Nazeem pretends love with Vazeer, finds the whereabouts of Begam Saheba and Abu releases his mother. But unfortunately, they were caught by soldiers, Vazeer orders to leave Abu in the desert, and throw Ali (Monkey) into the well and they do so. Then Ali comes into his original form. Meanwhile, Ibrahim generates public to revolt, all of them reach the fort along with Begam Saheba and reveal the entire truth. Eventually, in the desert, Abu liberates a demon, for which he gets a flying carpet as a gift; with its help, he immediately rushes the fort and stamps out Vazeer. Finally, Abu / Faruk becomes the emperor of Baghdad and marries Nazeem.

Cast 
N. T. Rama Rao as Faruk / Abu
Jayalalithaa as Nazeem
Rajanala as Vazeer Hussain
Relangi as Basra Sultan
Padmanabham as Ali
Allu Ramalingaiah
Mikkilineni as Bagdad Sultan
Mukkamala as Ibrahim
Pandari Bai as Began Saheba
Geetanjali
Vijayalalitha as dancer

Soundtrack 

Music composed by T. V. Raju.

References

External links 

1960s fantasy adventure films
1960s Telugu-language films
1968 films
Films based on Indian folklore
Films based on One Thousand and One Nights
Films directed by D. Yoganand
Films scored by T. V. Raju
Films set in Baghdad
Indian fantasy adventure films
Indian swashbuckler films